Balle may refer to:

Balle (surname)
Balle, Mali
Balle, Nigeria
Balle (runemaster)
Michael Ballack, German soccer player

See also
"Balle Balle", a song from the movie Bride and Prejudice
Ballet